Dráscula: The Vampire Strikes Back (Spanish: Dráscula: El Vampiro) is a 1996 graphic adventure game developed by Alcachofa Soft. It was created in Spain, and was the first adventure game released by Alcachofa. In 1999, Midas Interactive Entertainment released an English version of the game in the United Kingdom. Dráscula tells the story of John Hacker, a realtor who attempts to help "Count Drascula" sell real estate in Transylvania.

In 2017, HobbyConsolas declared Dráscula one of the nine best Spanish graphic adventure games. The publication's Clara Castaño Ruiz wrote, "[T]ogether with Igor: Objective Uikokahonia, [it was] one of the pioneer games of the genre in our country." In 2012, MeriStation's César Otero noted that the game's politically incorrect style of comedy was "totally outdated nowadays" but nevertheless a "guilty pleasure".

Dráscula was commercially unsuccessful. GameLive PCs Gerard Masnou wrote in 2003 that "dismal distribution by DMM has prevented many players from enjoying this little cult classic". In 2008, Jack Allin of Adventure Gamers described the game as "rare". During September of that year, support for the game was added to ScummVM, after Alcachofa handed the source code to the program's team. Alcachofa subsequently re-released Dráscula as freeware.

See also
3 Skulls of the Toltecs
Hollywood Monsters

References

External links
Official page (archived)
Later official page (archived)
Download page at ScummVM

1996 video games
1990s horror video games
Adventure games
Point-and-click adventure games
Video games developed in Spain
DOS games
Windows games
Freeware games
ScummVM-supported games
Parody video games
Video games set in castles
Video games set in Romania
Video games based on Dracula
Single-player video games
Alcachofa Soft games